Johannes Warnardus Bilders (18 August 1811 – 29 October 1890)  was a Dutch landscape-painter; he was the father of Gerard Bilders (1838–1865) and a forerunner of the Hague School because of his connections with H.W. Mesdag, Jozef Israëls, Willem Roelofs, his later wife Marie Bilders-van Bosse and others painters of The Hague.

Biography
Johannes Bilders was born in Utrecht and took lessons from Jan Lodewijk Jonxis (1789–1867). In 1830, at the time of the start of the Belgian Revolution, struggling for independence from The Netherlands, he registered as a Dutch volunteer soldier to help suppress the uprising against the Dutch government and King. He stayed in the army for a number of years, after which he returned to Utrecht and returned to his art-teacher Jonxis for painting lessons again. After travels in Germany, he settled down in 1841 at Oosterbeek, also called the 'Dutch Barbizon', where he gathered around him many young painters who would later become central figures in the Hague School. Some of these painters were Anton Mauve, Paul Gabriël and his son Gerard Bilders, among others.

In 1846 he returned to Utrecht, where he was employed until 1852. Then he spent one year in Amsterdam where he was acquainted with Jozef Israëls. He went back to Oosterbeek (1855–1858). After some time he went to Amsterdam for a long period (1858–1880), then back to Oosterbeek where he married his second wife, the woman-painter Marie Bilders-van Bosse. They spent there together 10 years; he died on 29 October 1890.

Gallery

References

External links
images of other paintings of Bilders, on Wikigallery
Dutch Art in the Nineteenth Century/The Forerunners of the Hague School.
 JW. Bilders in the Rijksmuseum

Sources
Marius, Gerharda Hermina, Dutch Painters of the 19th Century, The Antique Collectors' Club, Woodbridge, Suffolk

1811 births
1890 deaths
19th-century Dutch painters
Dutch male painters
Dutch landscape painters
Hague School
Artists from Utrecht
19th-century Dutch male artists